The John Gridley House is located in the southern section of Syracuse, New York. This section of Syracuse was originally known as Onondaga Hollow, and was settled thirty years before the City of Syracuse. The John Gridley House is significant as one of few houses remaining of the original Onondaga Hollow settlement. The two storey Federal style house was built around 1812 of local limestone. It was added to the National Register of Historic Places in 1977.

The house was built by the same stonemasons who built the Gen. Hutchinson House on Onondaga Hill, several miles away along the same route, the Seneca Turnpike. In 2010 a historic plaque was placed in front of the house.

References

External links

Houses completed in 1812
Federal architecture in New York (state)
Houses on the National Register of Historic Places in New York (state)
Historic American Buildings Survey in New York (state)
Houses in Syracuse, New York
National Register of Historic Places in Syracuse, New York